The Katangese Air Force (or FAK) or Katangese Military Aviation (or Avikat) was a short lived air force of the State of Katanga, established in 1960 under the command of Jan Zumbach. The force consisted predominantly of Belgian, French, and British mercenary pilots, operating a small number of helicopters and smaller number of fixed wing planes, including three attack aircraft delivered by the CIA.

History

Katangese Air Force 

In 1960, the leader of the CONAKAT party Moïse Tshombe, declared Katanga Province's secession from Congo-Léopoldville as the State of Katanga after unrest elsewhere in the Congo and the failure to establish a federalist regime in the country. The newly formed Katangese government requested military aid from Belgium while the Congolese state appealed for assistance to the United Nations. On 17 July 1960 United Nations Security Council Resolution 143 was adopted, which established the United Nations Operation in the Congo (ONUC) and would provide military assistance to the Congolese forces.

In August 1960, Tshombe began to establish military and paramilitary formations under the auspices of the Katangese Gendarmerie. It was also intended to include a small air force established from aircraft formerly used by the colonial-era Aviation militaire de la Force Publique (Avimil). It recruited mercenary pilots, including several veterans who had served in the Royal Air Force during World War II such as the Polish fighter pilot Jan Zumbach.

The primary role of the Katangese Air Force was to provide air support for ground troops and air interdiction.  Initial aircraft consisted of five de Havilland Doves, eight North American T-6 Texans, a de Havilland Heron, an Aérospatiale Alouette II helicopter, a Piper PA-18 and a single Sikorsky H-19 helicopter, which were left by the Belgian Air Force during the dissolution of the Belgian Congo. Additionally, nine Fouga CM.170 Magisters were purchased from France in 1961, but only three of these Fougas, which were armed with two machine guns and two locally made light bombs, were delivered by the CIA front organization Seven Seas Airlines. Furthermore, at least six German Dornier Do 28As were imported. The first reached Katanga in late August, with four more arriving in October. The Do 28s were subsequently armed and used mostly for air-to-ground attacks. Based at Luano airfield, Kolwezi and several smaller airfields in the hinterland, the FAK supported the Katangese ground troops by raiding ONUC troops and positions on several occasions. For two years, there was sporadic fighting between Katangese and ONUC forces. By 15 January 1963, the UN had finally established full control over Katanga. Remnants of the Katangese Air Force were all but gone, as most aircraft were destroyed or abandoned. Those that remained in the Congo were reintegrated into the Congolese Air Force.

Commanders 

It was initially commanded by the Belgian Victor Volant. In September 1961, in the aftermath of Operation Rum Punch, Volant left Katanga and command devolved to the Katangese pilot Jean-Marie Ngosa and his Belgian adviser José Delin. In the aftermath of Operation Unokat in December 1961, command first changed over to the South African Jeremiah Cornelius "Jerry" Puren, then, in early 1962, to Jan Zumbach, who commanded Avikat until the end of the Katangese secession in January 1963.

Alleged role in the death of Dag Hammarskjöld 

Dag Hammarskjöld, the United Nations Secretary-General, was killed on 18 September 1961 when his aircraft crashed at Ndola, Northern Rhodesia while en route to negotiations with Tshombe. The causes of the crash have never been definitively established but it is generally considered to have been accidental. Nonetheless, there has been speculation that Hammarskjöld's aircraft may have been shot down by the Katangese Air Force. Hammarskjöld's aircraft had taken a detour to avoid the Katangese frontier after widespread coverage of the use of Fouga aircraft by Katangese forces in skirmishes with United Nations forces. According to Bent Rosio, this had been "blown out of all proportions" by the international press. There had  been discussions about whether a fighter escort should be provided by the Imperial Ethiopian Air Force although this did not occur. Numerous accounts have been suggested. Jan Van Risseghem, a former RAF fighter pilot from Belgium, reportedly claimed to have shot down the aircraft personally but has been widely disbelieved. Another Belgian pilot, known only as "de Beukels", was also reported to have claimed separately to have shot down the aircraft by accident during an attempted aerial abduction of Hammarskjöld.

Aircraft 

The following fixed wing aircraft and helicopters were in service from 1960 until 1963:

See also 

 Katangese Gendarmerie
 Rhodesian Air Force
 Bophuthatswana Air Force

References

Further reading 

 

Separatism in the Democratic Republic of the Congo
History of the Democratic Republic of the Congo
1963 disestablishments
Disbanded air forces
State of Katanga
Mercenary units and formations